Chrysolarentia severata is a species of Larentiinae that occurs in Australia.

References
  

Euphyia
Moths of Australia
Moths described in 1857